The Research Office of the Reich Air Ministry (German: RLM/Forschungsamt (FA), English: "Research Bureau") was the signals intelligence and cryptanalytic agency of the German Nazi Party from 1933 to 1945. Run since its inception by Luftwaffe chief Hermann Göring, the Research Bureau was a Nazi Party institution rather than an official Wehrmacht-run military signals intelligence and cryptographic agency (headed up by the German High Command's OKW/Chi).

Described as "the richest, most secret, the most Nazi, and the most influential" of all the German cryptoanalytic intelligence agencies, its existence was well known to French intelligence (Deuxième Bureau, Bureau Central de Renseignements et d'Action) via the efforts of the spy Hans-Thilo Schmidt but little known to other countries within the Allies.

The organization was described by the historian, Dr Wilhelm F. Flicke, a German veteran cipher officer, who was commissioned by General Erich Fellgiebel, to write a history of German cryptography and cryptanalysis during World War II in his book War secrets in the ether as:

calculated to give the government and the [Nazi] dominant party such far-reaching insight into the thoughts, feelings, and aspirations of the German people as had been known in all history. Compared with this plan, the informer methods of Metternich and the French Minister of Police, Fouché had been amateurish experiments.

Other names for the FA included Hermann Göring's Research Bureau and Hermann Göring cipher bureau. Its official full name in German was Forschungsamt des Reichsluftfahrt Ministerium, and in English the "Research Office of the Ministry of Aviation",(Luftwaffe)

Emergence
The office of the RLM/Forschungsamt emerged with the events of the Reichstag Fire Decree. With Adolf Hitler's seizure of power by the Enabling Act of 1933, all postal, telegraph and telephone democracy was suspended. The Reichstag Fire Decree Articles 114, 115, 117, 118, 123, 124 and 153 of the Constitution of the German Reich were suspended until further notice. The article inter alia stated the secrecy of correspondence. It read:

The privacy of correspondence, postal, telegraphic and telephonic communications shall be inviolable. Exception may be only made by the Kingdom Act. See the §§ 99-101 of the Criminal Procedure Code from 1 February 1877 (RGBl. S. 253) in the version published on 4 January 1924 (RGBl. I. p.15)

By § 1 of the Reichstag Fire Decree, 28 February 1933 (RGBl. IS 83) was the Article 117 set "until further notice" overridden in conjunction with Article 48 para. 2 sentence 2.

History

Founding

Hermann Göring was a high ranking Nazi Party member who founded the party-run FA along with Gottfried Schapper in April 1933. Schapper had worked in the Reichswehr Ministry from 1927 to 1933 and been dissatisfied by both the scope of monitoring work and the incompetence of the methods employed there. He along with some colleagues, including Nazi, Hans Schimpf, his predecessor and a personal friend of Göring, resigned in 1933 and proposed to Göring that a separate office be created that would be free from department ties. Schimpf had previously organized a National Socialist cell within the Reichswehr without any word having leaked out about it. Schapper requested, due to both limited scope of operations and incompetence in the signals office of the Reichswehr Ministry, that the new agency be independent of the ministry. Göring consented and later stated during TICOM interrogations that he wanted an organization of his own which could handle all phases of monitoring under one central control.

Göring ensured it was camouflaged under the title Reichsluftrahrtministerium-Forschungsamt to confuse its role within the Nazi hierarchy, though in reality it was not connected to the Aviation ministry.  Göring also ensured by 1935 that it was not subordinated to the Reich Air Ministry, by having its own administration, with financing directly from the Treasury by 1938, and bore no relation to the research division of the Luftwaffe technical office, or the Luftwaffe's military intercept or cryptologic unit. By then it was known as Hermann Göring's Research Bureau.

The FA was a Nazi Party civilian organization, unlike complementary organizations that existed at the time, e.g. OKW/Chi, which were military in nature. For security purposes, a small number of individuals, who were civilians, were ordered to wear German Luftwaffe uniforms. This was to ensure fruitful communication between signals intelligence.

The original unit consisted of eight men when it was established on 10 April 1933. Later, as the agency expanded, an additional 33 cryptographers, most with Nazi leanings, would be "poached" from the Supreme Command of the Armed Forces, the OKW/Chi cipher bureau, at the time when OKW/Chi itself was facing a severe personnel shortage. This caused considerable friction between the two agencies. The FA was located in an attic in Göring's Air Ministry building and later moved to a building in Behrendstrasse, Berlin. It then moved again in late 1933 to the Hotel am Knie in Chariottenberg. In 1934 and 1935 it occupied a converted housing complex called the Schiller Colonnades at 116-124 Schillerstrase. Forced to evacuate Berlin due to the heavy Allied bombing, by January 1945 most of the unit had moved to Breslau and Luebben (site of an intercept station) and Jueterbog. By March, the remnants were sent to Kaufbeuren with a small group moving to Rosenheim. By this point the FA had shrunk from around 2000 personnel down to 450 with 100 at Rosenheim. At Kaufbeuren it occupied a block of six buildings at the airfield barracks on the local airfield, secured by the 289th Combat Engineers. The FA had been disbanded and all documents burned shortly before the arrival of the American Army. A small handful of documents discovered after an extensive search provided confirmation of the existence of the FA and provided a basic outline of its organization.

Surveillance
Whereas the operational scope of the Foreign office and the Reichswehr were organized to monitor foreign communications, the Forschungsamt was designed to monitor interior communications, to collect all communications throughout Germany, and from Germany to foreign countries. The press, all printed material, the surveillance of personal letters, and the interception of conversations were undertaken. Intercept stations were distributed all over Germany, postal districts and cable junctions all had surveillance points. All telegrams sent by anybody were copied and sent to the unit.

Interception of telephone conversations of high ranking government officials, Nazi Party members and state officials were of particular importance. Gradually, an enormous spy net was created that spanned all of Germany. No officer, no official, no party functionary and no person of importance could telephone without the conversation being monitored. The FA paid particular attention to the Reichswehr personnel and commanders of military districts. A system of confidential agents was established to pass it to the FA. Surveillance of general delivery letters formed a large part of the FA.

At the outset, the FA tried to work with the Reichswehr cipher bureau and Bureau C of the Foreign Office, but the relationship quickly soured, due to the nature of the FA always to be the receiver and never the giver. Eventually, cooperation was undertaken in a purely formal manner.

Objectives
A number of objectives came into being, in the first phase of the FA operation.

 The Officer Corps of the Reichswehr, and the armed forces, in general, were put under surveillance. 
 The leading figures of the Nazi Party were put under surveillance.
 The Catholic Church, the Vatican with all its institutions and leading personalities were put under surveillance. 
 Anybody in Germany who had been active in political life, e.g. trade union movements, labour organizations, Freemasonry. For this objective, there was close collaboration with the Gestapo.

Conflict

The nature of the work that the FA undertook, inevitably brought the agency to the notice of Heinrich Himmler, who attempted on his own initiative to gain control of the unit and its activity. This led to an intense rivalry between Göring and Himmler. In time, Himmler succeeded in getting a stronger influence on the unit, so that gradually power in respect of the FA passed from Göring to Himmler.

Ernst Röhm affair

The first major operation of the FA was the surveillance of Ernst Röhm. Ernst Röhm was the co-founder of the Sturmabteilung (SA; Storm Detachment), the Nazi Party's militia, and later was its commander. Röhm and his SA associates had been watched continuously since the end of 1933. Every telephone conversation, letter written, and every conversation that Röhm had uttered was reported to the FA. For many of the associates of Röhm, microphones had been placed in their private lodgings. These were concealed in their telephones, table lamps, chandeliers, electric clocks and other locations. The evidence collected was collated and evaluated in the evaluation centre of the FA. This evidence led directly to the Night of the Long Knives, which took place from 30 June to 2 July 1934 in which 85-200 members of the SA and others were assassinated.  During this action Schimpf was promoted to ministerial rank, which ensured for himself a position of great power.

Tukhachevski affair

The second major operation of the FA was the Mikhail Tukhachevsky case.

Housecleaning affair

The third major operation of the FA was the supposed "housecleaning" operation that was undertaken by the FA in 1938, when significant numbers of personnel from the Ministry of War were forcefully removed. Two major figures were Werner von Blomberg and the aristocrat Baron Werner von Fritsch and a number of very high ranking officers who had to leave the field. Flicke considered this Göring's revenge, and the revenge of the FA for the death of Hans Schimpf.

During this time, the Foreign Office, which was controlled by Joachim von Ribbentrop, was wired with microphones without any ministry official noticing.

Austrian affair

The FA played a very important role in the intercepting communications of the government of the Federal State of Austria before the Anschluss occupation in March 1938. A special subsection in the FA was formed, and subsequently the entire communications system of Austria was intercepted. They were increasingly aided in their operation by sympathetic Austrian officials. All telephone conversations carried out in Austrian ministries, the content of all telegrams sent abroad, and many important documents were sent to the Forschungsamt. The Austrian officials even went as far as to provide all the cryptographic systems used by the Foreign Office in Vienna, by the Austrian Armed Forces and by the Austrian Police. The Austrian telephone and telegraph cables leading through the Berchtesgaden areas were tapped by the FA.

Himmler takeover

By 20 July 1944, Heinrich Himmler had firmly gained control over the FA.

TICOM

TICOM was the operation by the United States to seize military assets after the end of World War II in Europe. The existence of Göring's Research Bureau was unknown by TICOM at the start of the war, which came as some surprise when papers were discovered by TICOM Team 1 at the Kaufbeuren Air Base indicating it was the FA's final location after fleeing there from heavy combat zones in the north.

Key personnel
Hermann Göring was the most important individual at the FA. He was a German politician, military leader, and leading member of the Nazi Party (NSDAP).

Director Hans Schimpf was the first head of the FA between 10 April 1933 and 10 April 1935. A former Corvette captain (Korvettenkapitän), he was a liaison officer between the Abwehr and the navy department, Reichsmarine/B-Dienst, at the Defence Ministry.

Director Christoph Prinz von Hessen was a German SS officer who managed the agency between 10 April 1935 and 12 October 1943. He was the son of Prince Frederick Charles of Hesse and Princess Margaret of Prussia, a member of one of the oldest traceable families in Christendom (Charlemagne) and a direct relation to the British Royal Family. He was killed in an airplane accident in Italy on 7 October 1943. Christoph's SS membership and subsequent appointment to the Forschungsamt pointed to a close relationship between the unit and the Sicherheitsdienst (Security Service; SD), which was the SS branch that served as the intelligence gathering and ideological watchdog of the Nazi Party.

Director Gottfried Schapper, an extreme Anti semitic, was also a German SS officer who held the rank of Hauptsturmführer, and managed the agency between 12 October 1943 and the end of the war on 8 May 1945. Schapper had been a soldier in World War I and from 1916 to 1917 had been director of the cryptographic offices in the Central Command of the German Army. He had worked in the Reichswehr Ministry from 1927 onwards, becoming instrumental in bringing the scattered services at the ministry under a central organization, and eventually becoming its head in 1933. Having known Göring from the First World War, he approached Göring, along with Schimpf and Hesse, to create the new agency. It was Schapper who came up with the name of the agency, Forschungsamt. In May 1945 he was arrested near Rosenheim by TICOM agents and taken to Salzburg and later Augsburg to be interrogated.

Organization
The FA was organized into six main sections or departments (Hauptabteilung) as follows:

 Principle Department I: Administration. The department was the administrative HQ for the unit, and dealt with organization, administration and personnel. Commanded by Principle Specialist Bergeren. The section had 50 people split into two subsections.

 Section 1: Commanded by Senior Specialist (Abbr. ORR) Rosenhan, it was responsible for correspondence, basic personnel recruitment and budgets. This included electric eye passes, identification passes, guard rotas, work rotas, air raid precautions and soap rations.

 Section 2: Commanded by Senior Specialist Kunsemueller, it was responsible for administration.

 Principle Department II: Personnel. Commanded by Senior Specialist Kempe. The department was responsible for personnel records and consisted of 80 to 100 men.
 Principle Department III: Intercept. Commanded by Senior Specialist Breuer. The department was responsible for intercept, including the actual intercept stations and initial sorting of intercepted messages. It consisted of over 200 personnel and two sections.

 Section 4: Commanded by Specialist Poop, it was responsible for all FA intercepts. This included intercept control, determination of priorities, locations of stations, and actual administration of the intercept personnel.

 Section 5: Commanded by Dr. Henke, the unit worked as a message center for all intercepts and distributing it to Main Section IV or Main Section V. No traffic analysis was undertaken, only sorted by language and traffic type. Non encrypted messages, e.g. private and commercial messages, press articles, telephone monitoring intercepts were sent direct to Main Section V. Code and cipher text was sorted as to type, e.g. military, diplomatic or commercial. Military intercepts were passed to OKW/Chi for decrypting. Diplomatic traffic would be shared amongst agencies. Any material which was to be worked on by the FA was automatically passed to Department IV.

 Principle Department IV: Codes and Ciphers. Consisting of 180 men, it was commanded by Leading Minister Georg Schroeder.  The department was responsible for the cryptanalysis of all foreign, i.e. enemy signals.

 Section 6: Research. Commanded by an officer named Paetzel, it came into existence in 1944 and had about 40 personnel working in the unit. The nature of the section was one of research on new systems, work specifically that other sections could not work on. They dealt with diplomatic traffic of America, England, Japan, Free France, Spain, and Spanish America.

 Section 7: Overseas and Southwest. Commanded by Senior Specialist Weachter and consisted of between 60 to 70 personnel. Their work included USA, England, Latin America, Spain, Portugal, Turkey, Egypt and the Far East. Senior Specialist Weachter was an expert on American systems. Dr. Erfurt was the only Japanese translator in this unit.

Section 8: West and South. Commanded by Senior Specialist Schulze, it was composed of 30 to 40 people. They worked on France, Belgium, Switzerland, Netherlands, Romania and Italian ciphers.

Section 9: East, Southeast, Middle and North. Commanded by Senior Specialist Wenzel. The number of personnel varies, depending on TICOM interrogation reports, but was supposed between 45 and 70.

 Principle Department V: Evaluation. Commanded by Principle Specialist Walter Seifert, who commanded around 400 people, which was the biggest number of people for the bureau. Seifert stated of the department:

The object of the department was the production of a purely objective and scientific picture of the world wide political and commercial situation.

Section 10: Information Dissemination. Commanded by Specialist Dr Mews. Serving as a library and archive, containing voluminous files of practically every type of information from most countries. This included text books, maps, telephone directories, city plans, newspapers and periodicals. Essentially this section provided the material needed to evaluate and add context to decrypted messages. The staff also included four or five translators.

Section 11: Foreign Policy Evaluation under Senior Specialist Dr Kurzbach.

Section 12: Economic Evaluation. Commanded by acting head Brieschke.

Section 13: Internal Affairs Evaluation. Commanded by Specialist Rentschler, the section employed about 80 people in 1944 while in Berlin.

 Principle Department VI: Technical. Commanded by Senior Specialist Dipl. Ing. Stabenow.

 Section 14: Development of own cipher machinery.

 Section 15: Comparison and evaluation of captured Machinery.

Operations

Linguistic output

The final output of the FA was Brown Reports or Brown Sheets (Braune Meldungen or Braunblätter). Recipients of these reports included Chief of the Armed Forces Wilhelm Keitel, Chief of Operations Alfred Jodl, Göring, Foreign Minister Ribbentrop, Grand Admiral Karl Donitz and Hitler.

In cases where special reports were created, these had a much shorter distribution list, specifically only Göring and Hitler. Information that would be considered special, for example, were the Berlin-Rome telephone conversations between Italian Prime Minister Benito Mussolini and Italian Foreign Minister Galeazzo Ciano.

Hitler's view on the FA reports were that they were extremely reliable, with the material presented to Hitler verbatim. Linguists were given orders not to make guesses if there were gaps, but to fill them with rows of dots. A special courier section was used that traveled in special cars, not railway cars, with dispatch boxes set up for which only Hitler, Ribbentrop and Göring possessed the keys. Once read, reports were returned, and sometimes due to mixups in sheet numbering or missing sheets due to human error, specific sheets would be re-requested.

Primary Distribution list
The government agencies on the distribution list for daily brownsheets of the RLM/Forschungsamt were:

 Reichswirtschaftsministerium - Ministry of Domestic Economy.
 Reichsfinanzministerium - Finance Ministry.
 Reichspropagandaministerium - Propaganda Ministry.
 Auswärtiges Amt - Foreign Ministry.
 Buero Ribbentrop - Private Intelligence Service of the Foreign Ministry.
 Ministerium Speer - Armament Ministry.
 RSHA - Headquarters for the security police, security services, criminal police and Einsatzgruppen.
 Oberkommando der Wehrmacht - German Military High Command.

Interception
The FA ran its own intercept stations. To meet its operational requirements, the FA used 5 different station types, and were called Research Posts (Forschungsstellen). The stations were categorized as follows:

 A Stations - Telephone Intercept
 B Stations - Wireless Intercept
 C Stations - Radio Broadcast Monitoring
 D Stations - Teletype and Telegraph Intercept
 F Stations - Mail Censorship

The A stations were positioned throughout Germany and later in German-occupied countries. These stations were equipped with one of two interceptor switchboards, which enabled the operator to tap into any conversation. The taping was done at the post office with tap lines routed into the station. Included in each switchboard was a Wire recording recorder. The operations of the A stations changed at the start of the war. Prior to September 1939, the intercept stations acted in a civilian function, reporting on the many international lines coming into Germany. Although the locations of most A stations are not available from TICOM documentation, it is known that Berlin had a large A station, which was used to tap the conversations of the diplomatic corps. It had a staff of around 100 people, including 50 to 60 intercept personnel. After the war, these operations ceased, with new operations largely concerned with war production bottlenecks, domestic affairs and attitudes of large industries.

B stations were usually positioned outside of towns in points of good wireless reception. Radio messages were intercepted by short wave receivers and then relayed in written form to the FA headquarters. After the war, B stations became increasingly important with the end of telephone conversations between Germany and other nations with the loss of foreign information.

Only one C station existed, which performed the pure monitoring service of public broadcasts from other countries.

The 3 D stations were located in Berlin, Vienna and Dortmund, which were the chief centres of cablegrams leaving Germany. The D stations operations were also greatly diminished after the start of the war.

The F stations were created after Germany was at war, were not extensive in operation. Censorship offices were operated by OKW and later by RSHA. The F station consisted of small groups attached to these censorship posts. It was known that the FA was concerned with postal censorship

In addition to the stations operating in Germany, the FA setup operational units in occupied countries. In the Netherlands and Poland, A stations were installed with advancing troops.  In Vienna, for example, the A station was functioning two days after the occupation. Mobile units were also used during the Polish campaign, but were reported to be largely unsuccessful chiefly because of lack of cooperation with the German Army.

Specialist Oden Hoeckley, head of Section 15 of the FA, who had been employed by Siemens and Halske, and been classmates of various members of WA Pruef 7  (Waffenamt), and also collaborated on the design of the T53e (Siemens and Halske T52) teleprinter, stated the following:

There were 100 to 150 sets at the Templin and Luebben station and from 20 to 30 at Cologne, Konstanz, Eutin, and Gols. Traffic was forwarded by cipher teleprinter, i.e. the T52c, T52d or T52e. The FA did not develop its own intercept equipment, preferring to use the Army, the Reichspost or industry equipment.

Liaison

Liaison with OKW/CHI
Liaison between the OKW/Chi and the FA was known to exist A special liaison officer (German:Verbindungsmann), Dr E. Klautachke, was assigned to the Supreme Command of the Armed Forces. The form of this liaison took the form of passing intelligence to the Supreme Command and answering specific questions. Dr Klautachke stated that he did not concern himself with cryptologic matters and stated that liaison regarding these matters did not exist. Considerable ill feeling existed between the FA and OKW/Chi. Wilhelm Fenner in his homework for "TICOM" stated that friction existed between the FA and OKW/Chi started when 33 people went over from Chi to the FA. Personnel friction between Fenner and Selchow existed as well. The question of competence could be used as a lever, as Hitler had assigned the working of diplomatic messages to the FA exclusively, which OKW/Chi had decided that it was not going to let that work move to the FA. Fenner considered the FA had overreached its competence, as the continual requests for help for decipherment aid by the FA to the Pers Z S showed that the FA was not able to supply what was desired.  Indeed, the GA tried to get aid from Chi thus overlooking its claim that the OKW/Chi was not competent.  Indeed, the OKW/Chi understood neither the organization nor the operations of the FA. The FA sent its traffic to Pers Z S and Chi but to Chi only what the FA saw fit to send, and the OKW/Chi would sometimes receive material from Pers Z S, which was not supplied direct. However it was clear that intercepted traffic was still exchanged between the two units.  Indeed, up to 30% of all the intercept traffic received by OKW/Chi came from the FA  Fenner stated he had no use for the FA and considered it a private toy of Göring, for which it has no excuse except to further inflate Göring's vanity.

Attempts were made by the FA to take over the monitoring function for the OKW/Chi which was vigorously resisted and in view of the types of monitoring which the FA conducted, which was similar to the FA requirements, would suggest the duplication of monitoring activities as unnecessary.  Dr. Walther Fricke, a leading cryptographer of the OKW/Chi, who stated that he knew nothing of the FA until some of them came to Schloss Glucksburg, and who stated that they were a big names with nothing behind them, on being told that the FA employed over 2000 personnel, his comments were:
For their deciphering they should have needed a handful. They must have had other work to do, but what the devil could they have been doing with 2000 people?

Liaison with General der Nachrichtenaufklärung
As regards General der Nachrichtenaufklärung (Abbr. GDNA), the signals intelligence office of the Oberkommando des Heeres, it was evident that greater liaison took place. This liaison took the form of actual division of tasks and sharing of personnel information. Liaison was also conducted over the IBM developments (Hollerith machines). One of the most important achievements of the FA which resulted from this cooperation and was revealed by Dr Otto Buggisch, one of the leading cryptanalyst of Inspektorate 7. Buggisch reported that the FA was able to read Russian Teletype traffic. Buggisch stated that the FA had some success in reconstructing a Russian Teletype machine in 1943 and recognized it had certain similarities in design with the German SZ40. After a short time, the Soviets changed the design. The FA communicated its results to Inspektorate 7 and were given a report on the solution of a German cipher teleprinter (the model unknown). Buggisch stated this was one of the very rare cases where the FA and Insp. 7/VI exchanged results. Other areas of liaison were known to exist. Insp. 7/VI took the lead amongst German cipher agencies in the use of IBM Hollerith machinery to conduct cryptologic work. This machinery was made available to other agencies. Wilhelm Tranow of the B-Dienst stated:

About March 1942 we paid a visit, in conjunction with the Luftwaffe and the FA, to the OKH Hollerith department in Victoriastrasse, Berlin.

Liaison with OKL-Stelle
The position of the FA and the OKL-Stelle, the cipher bureau for high command of the Luftwaffe under Göring, should have facilitated an exchange of information between them. TICOM interrogation found no ill feeling between the FA and OKL-Stelle indicates that was not the case. OKL-Stelle was concerned with air traffic ciphers, so a functional division did exist between the two agencies. However, the FA did supply diplomatic and general intelligence to OKL-Stelle.  Lt. Colonel Friederich, Chief of Division III of OKL-Stelle stated:

He did not work with them [the RLM/FA] except to the extent that Chief Cryptanalyst Ferdinand Voegele, Chief of Section E,  sometimes met with cryptanalysts from this and other agencies to discuss general problems. The FA furnished the Luftwaffe with appropriate traffic on occasion. We asked what was the function of the FA. He said its purpose was really hidden from the services, who were not allowed entry to the establishment. Only Voegele had any contact with them and that only with the cryptanalysts.

Friederich knew that it was a political organization, not military. When it worked on foreign systems, it was only on traffic in the rear.

Liaison with B-Dienst
Liaison between the FA and the Signal Intelligence Agency of the Navy High Command (B-Dienst) was documented in B-Dienst Yearly Progress reports prepared by the navy and by interrogation of B-Dienst Chief Cryptologist Wilhelm Tranow. Cooperation took the form of working on the cracking of the British Inter Departmental Cipher. Tranow stated in interview:

I informed the FA, the OKW/Chi and the GAF [Luftwaffe] of the existence of this cipher in 1940 and the FA and the Navy (B-Dienst) worked on it. The OKW/Chi and the GAF restricted themselves rather to reviving the cypher data when worked out. The GAF did a little work on it, however, and passed any recovered keys on to us. The cypher went out of use in December 1942. This was the last of it. I believe it was used occasionally at a few stations. I stopped work on it [around] December 1942. The FA continued to send us occasional results. In particular these consisted again and again of information about our U-boat losses and British shipping losses etc.

According to Tranow, 2 to 3% of all intercept traffic came from the FA.

Liaison with AA/Pers Z S

The status of the liaison between the FA and the AA/Pers Z, the cipher department of the Foreign Office (Germany) was more fully understood by TICOM. Joachim von Ribbentrop, the foreign minister of Nazi Germany stated that Minister (Gesandter I Kl.) Selchow, the director of the AA/Pers SZ worked closely with the FA. The Liaison Officer was Dr Gerstmeyer.  TICOM Team 1 first learned the existence of the FA from the foreign office cryptanalysts, who knew the names of many of the section heads in Department IV in which their work was related The Yearly Report for 1942 from AA/Per Z inter alia, reveals an exchange of code book recoveries. The name of Senior Specialist Waechter of the FA appears in the Yearly Report and the names of other FA personnel occur in the code books stored in the AA/Per Z archives. From this evidence it is clear that technical cryptanalyst liaison existed between the FA and the AA/Per Z.

Cryptanalysis successes by country
Only eighty odd references to different types of intercept traffic were known to exist from TICOM interrogations, and the details surrounding these references were vague, unlike the detail provided, for example, by the Signal Intelligence Agency of the German Foreign Office, Pers Z S, the Signal Intelligence Agency of the Supreme Command of the Armed Forces, OKW/Chi or the Department of the German Naval Intelligence Service, B-Dienst when TICOM interrogations turned to liaison between the agencies, when considerable more detail was revealed. There was considerable evidence that the FA possessed copies of a surprising number of code books, although there is no indication in TICOM interrogation documentation, exactly how the FA procured the code books.

Senior Specialist Dr Martin Paetzel, who was responsible for Section 5 and alternate head of Main Section IV of the FA, was responsible for providing most of the intelligence regarding which ciphers were broken and worked on by the FA. Other sources included Georg Schroeder, responsible for Department IV, Erwin Rentschler, head of section 13 of the FA, Wilhelm Tranow, lead cryptanalyst and director of B-Dienst, Dr Kurt Sauerbier who was responsible for sub-section C of Section 9 of the FA. The Russian section is the longest, as Russia ciphers was what concerned TICOM the most.

Evaluation
The operation of the FA, in conjunction with the list of FA cryptologic successes, was believed by TICOM to provide ample evidence to state that the FA was a highly successful intelligence producing organization. From an account given to the interrogators, it was obvious that the FA received a vast amount of material, processed it and sent it to those people and organizations who could make the most use of it. The level of co-operation with other German cryptologic agencies is difficult to estimate. Certainly the statements of individuals employed by the different agencies as regard FA, were defeatist in tone.  Both the other agencies and the FA complained that they knew little of each other's operational counterparts with the other agencies personnel stating that the FA personnel were standoffish and exclusive. Yet examination of activity reports, yearly reports, captured work books, memos and other salient information revealed an active exchange of technical data, coordination and sharing of assignments of personnel at all levels.

Notes
TICOM's documentation archive consists of 11 primary documents, Volume I to Volume IX. These are aggregate summary documentation, each volume targeting a specific German military agency. The archive also consists of Team Reports, DF-Series, I-Series, IF-Series and M-series reports which cover various aspects of TICOM interrogation.

Volume VII, which covers Göring Research Bureau, contains over 32 references to the I-Series documents, which are TICOM Intelligence reports. It also covers references to the full gamut of the other types of reports, e.g. DF-Series, and IF-Series, of which there are over 1500.

 I-26 Interrogation of Oblt. Schubert (OKH/Chef HNW/Gen.d.NA) on Russian Military and Agents systems at OKM Signals School, Flensburg on 17 June 1945
 I-54 Second Interrogation of five members of the RLM/Forshungsamt
 I-93 Detailed Interrogation of Members of OKM 4 SKL III at Flensburg.
 IF-132 DAS FORSHUNGSAMT DES REICHSLUFTFAHRTMINISTERIUMS
 I-85  P.O.W. Interrogation Report on Reg. Rat Flicke, Tech, Insp. Pokojewski, Stabsintendant Hatz of OKW/Chi.
 I-147 Detailed Interrogation of Members of OKM 4/SKL III at Flensburg
 I-176 "Homework by 'Wachtmeister Dr. Otto Buggisch of OKH/Chi and OKW/Chi."
 DF-9 Activity Report OKW/Chi 1/1/44 to 25/6/44
 D-16 Translation of Annual Progress Reports by Pers ZS covering 1927, 1941, 1942

References

Cryptography organizations
History of telecommunications in Germany
Signals intelligence agencies
Signals intelligence of World War II
Research and development in Nazi Germany
Military history of Germany during World War II
Military communications of Germany